The Holy Spirit Cathedral also called Quetzaltenango Cathedral, is a Catholic church in Quetzaltenango, Guatemala. It was founded by the conquistadors, shortly after having defeated the legendary local hero Tecun Uman. The city was dedicated by the Spanish to the Holy Spirit.

This church, one of the first to be founded in Quetzaltenango, contains two of the most revered images of the region: The Divine Just Judge and the Virgin of the Rosary. The two images come out in procession on Good Friday and during the holidays in October respectively.

The present Cathedral suffered at least 3 changes in the last modification remained the facade.

See also
Roman Catholicism in Guatemala
Holy Spirit Cathedral

References

Roman Catholic cathedrals in Guatemala
Buildings and structures in Quetzaltenango